Earthenware is glazed or unglazed nonvitreous pottery that has normally been fired below .  Basic earthenware, often called terracotta, absorbs liquids such as water.  However, earthenware can be made impervious to liquids by coating it with a ceramic glaze, and is used for the great majority of modern domestic earthenware.  The main other important types of pottery are porcelain, bone china, and stoneware, all fired at high enough temperatures to vitrify. End applications include tableware, decorative ware such as figurines.

Earthenware comprises "most building bricks, nearly all European pottery up to the seventeenth century, most of the wares of Egypt, Persia and the near East; Greek, Roman and Mediterranean, and some of the Chinese; and the fine earthenware which forms the greater part of our tableware today" ("today" being 1962).  Pit fired earthenware dates back to as early as 29,000–25,000 BC, and for millennia, only earthenware pottery was made, with stoneware gradually developing some 5,000 years ago, but then apparently disappearing for a few thousand years.  Outside East Asia, porcelain was manufactured only from the 18th century AD, and then initially as an expensive luxury.

After it is fired, earthenware is opaque and non-vitreous, soft and capable of being scratched with a knife. The Combined Nomenclature of the European Union describes it as being made of selected clays sometimes mixed with feldspars and varying amounts of other minerals, and white or light-coloured (i.e., slightly greyish, cream, or ivory).

Characteristics
Generally, unfired earthenware bodies exhibit higher plasticity than most whiteware bodies and hence are easier to shape by RAM press, roller-head or potter's wheel than bone china or porcelain.

Due to its porosity, fired earthenware, with a water absorption of 5-8%, must be glazed to be watertight. Earthenware has lower mechanical strength than bone china, porcelain or stoneware, and consequently articles are commonly made in thicker cross-section, although they are still more easily chipped.

Darker-coloured terracotta earthenware, typically orange or red due to a comparatively high content of iron oxides, are widely used for flower pots, tiles and some decorative and oven ware.

Production

Materials

The compositions of earthenware bodies vary considerably, and include both prepared and 'as dug'; the former being by far the dominant type for studio and industry. A general body formulation for contemporary earthenware is 25% kaolin, 25% ball clay, 35% quartz and 15% feldspar.

Shaping

Firing

Some studio potters follow the reverse practice, with a low-temperature biscuit firing and a high-temperature glost firing. Oxidising atmospheres are the most common.

After firing, most earthenware bodies will be colored white, buff or red. For iron-rich bodies earthenware, firing at comparatively low temperature in a oxidising atmosphere results in a red colour, whilst higher temperatures with a reducing atmosphere results in darker colours, including black. Higher firing temperatures may cause earthenware to bloat.

Examples of earthenware

Despite the most highly valued types of pottery often switching to stoneware and porcelain as these were developed by a particular culture, there are many artistically important types of earthenware.  All Ancient Greek and Ancient Roman pottery is earthenware, as is the Hispano-Moresque ware of the late Middle Ages, which developed into tin-glazed pottery or faience traditions in several parts of Europe, mostly notably the painted maiolica of the Italian Renaissance, and Dutch Delftware.  With a white glaze, these were able to imitate porcelains both from East Asia and Europe. 

Amongst the most complicated earthenware ever made are the life-size Yixian glazed pottery luohans of the Liao dynasty (907–1125), Saint-Porchaire ware of the mid-16th century, apparently made for the French court and the life-size majolica peacocks by Mintons in the 1860s.

In the 18th century, especially in English Staffordshire pottery, technical improvements enabled very fine wares such as Wedgwood's creamware, that competed with porcelain with considerable success, as his huge creamware Frog Service for Catherine the Great showed.  The invention of transfer printing processes made highly decorated wares cheap enough for far wider sections of the population in Europe.   

In China, sancai glazed wares were lead-glazed earthenware, and as elsewhere, terracotta remained important for sculpture. The Etruscans had made large sculptures such as statues in it, where the Romans used it mainly for figurines and Campana reliefs. Chinese painted or Tang dynasty tomb figures were earthenware as were the later Yixian glazed pottery luohans. After the ceramic figurine was revived in European porcelain, earthenware figures followed, such as the popular English Staffordshire figures.

See also
Other types of earthenware or other examples include:
 Terracotta
 Redware
 Victorian majolica
 Lusterware, which uses iridescent glazes
 Raku
 Ironstone china, on the border of earthenware and stoneware
 Yellowware

References

Further reading
 Rado, P. An Introduction to the Technology Of Pottery. 2nd edition. Pergamon Press, 1988.
 Ryan W. and Radford, C. Whitewares: Production, Testing And Quality Control. Pergamon Press, 1987.
 Hamer, Frank and Janet. The Potter's Dictionary of Materials and Techniques. A & C Black Publishers Limited, London, England, Third Edition, 1991. .
 "Petersons": Peterson, Susan, Peterson, Jan, The Craft and Art of Clay: A Complete Potter's Handbook, 2003, Laurence King Publishing, 9781856693547, google books

External links
 Digital Version of "A Representation of the manufacturing of earthenware" — 1827 text on the manufacture of earthenware
 Short film on pottery making around the world
 Tin-glazed earthenware livery-button, ca 1651, Victoria & Albert museum jewellery collection

Clay
Ceramic materials
Crockery
Pottery
Serving vessels
Cooking vessels
Food storage containers